South Marston is a village and civil parish in the Borough of Swindon, Wiltshire, England.

History
The earliest documentary evidence for continuous settlement dates from the 13th century, but there is fragmentary archaeological evidence of occupation as far back as the Bronze Age.

It is claimed that there were Roman remains just outside South Marston in a field belonging to Rowborough Farm, but these have long disappeared. Ermin Way, a major Roman road linking Silchester and Gloucester, passed close to the village on the south-west side, separating it from Stratton St Margaret. There was a Roman station at Durocornovium, now Covingham, one mile south of the village.

The name "Marston" derives from a common Old English toponym meaning "marsh farm". This suggests that the village was founded before the Norman conquest of England in 1066, although it is not recorded in the Domesday Book of 1086. Documentary evidence of the village exists from about 1280, when it is mentioned as part of Highworth Hundred.

South Marston became a civil parish in 1894. For church purposes, South Marston was a chapelry of Highworth until it became a separate church parish in 1889.

Industries
Early in the Second World War, a Ministry of Aircraft Production shadow factory and airfield were built for Phillips & Powis Aircraft Ltd, and 1,090 Miles Master training aircraft were built there. Short Brothers Ltd also used another part of the airfield for final assembly and testing of locally-built Short Stirling bombers. Vickers-Armstrongs-Supermarine acquired the site in 1945 and produced Supermarine aircraft including Spitfire, Seafire, Attacker, Swift and Scimitar there until 1961; the factory continued to produce components for Vickers until the early 1980s.

In 1985, Honda bought the site, which straddles the boundary with Stratton St Margaret parish, and turned it over to car manufacture. It was the company's sole British plant and employed 3,500 in 2019 when Honda announced that it would close in 2021. In that year the site was sold to Panattoni, an American industrial real estate developer, who intended to use it for a large-scale logistics operation.

The principal book storage facility for Oxford's Bodleian Libraries has been on South Marston Industrial Estate since 2010.

Sport 
Teams at the Vickers-Armstrongs works included a football team and a rugby team, who continue today under altered names: Swindon Supermarine F.C. and Supermarine RFC. Since the 1980s they have shared facilities at Hunts Copse just north of South Marston, alongside other sports, a bowls club and the Supermarine Sports & Social Club.

Notable resident
Alfred Williams, poet and steam-hammer operator at Swindon Railway Works, died in South Marston on 10 April 1930 aged 52.

Demography
A large residential development was built on the site of the Manor House in the mid-1980s. Further development plans were made in 2015.

References

External links
Parish Council
History section of the Parish Council website, a referenced resource that summarizes research into the village's history
South Marston's aircraft industry at Swindonweb

Civil parishes in Wiltshire
Borough of Swindon
Villages in Wiltshire